Éléonore Bernheim also appearing as Éléonore Gosset-Bernheim, (and Éléonore Gosset 2011 and prior) is a French actress who began professional work in the late 1990s. 

Gosset-Bernheim is currently starring in the continuing television series L'Art du crime, which airs in the United States and other English-speaking countries on TV5Monde and MHZ Choice. Gosset-Bernheim is a 2003 graduate of the Conservatoire national supérieur d'art dramatique in Paris.

Works

In film
 Terminale de Francis Girod (1998), playing Caroline 
 Kennedy et moi (1999), playing Alice Polaris
 Les Infortunes de la beauté (1999) 
 Cyrano (short film, 2000) 
 Pas d'histoires! (12 regards sur le racisme au quotidien) (2001), playing Marie ("Cyrano") 
 Les Âmes câlines (2001), playing la jeune femme de la piscine,  directed by Thomas Bardinet
 Lokarri (2002), directed by Jean Pierre Grasset
 S.A.C.: des hommes dans l'ombre (2004), playing la fille de Routier
 Nos vies rêvées (2004), playing Bénédicte Tassin
 Un truc dans le genre (2005), playing Alice
 Le héros de la famille (2006), playing Véra 
 Les Enfants, j'adore! (2006), playing Joséphine
 Jean-Philippe (2006)
 Les Beaux Jours (2013), playing Lise 
 Elle l'adore (2014), playing Joueuse de poker (as Éléonore Bernheim)
 Bis (2015), playing la mère de Patrice (as Éléonore Bernheim) 
 L'invitation (2015), playing Carine
 Les Infortunes de la beauté (1999), directed by John Lvoff

In television
 Maigret (season 9,episode 1, 2000), playing Francine Tremblet
 Le Silence de l'épervier (Season 1, 2008), playing Justine Lefort 
  (2017-), playing Florence Chassagne (as Éléonore Bernheim)

References

Further reading
 "Gaumont, Cinetévé Team..."

External links

1977 births
Living people
French film actresses
French television actresses